is located in Kokura Minami-ku Kitakyushu, Japan. It is used for horse racing. It was built in 1994. It has a capacity of 20,000. It has 1,192 seats.

Physical attributes
Kokura Racecourse has grass courses and a dirt course.

The turf measures 1615m (1 mile + 19 feet). 
1000m, 1200m, 1700m, 1800m, 2000m, and 2600m races run on the oval.

The dirt course measures 1445 meters (7/8 mile + 310 feet).
1000m, 1700m, and 2400m races run on the oval.

Notable races 

Sports venues in Fukuoka Prefecture
Horse racing venues in Japan
Buildings and structures in Kitakyushu
Sports venues completed in 1994
1994 establishments in Japan